The 1st Short Course Swimming World Championships were organized by FINA and held in Palma de Mallorca, Spain, December 2–5, 1993. The meet featured competition in a short course (25 meter) pool. During the championships, a total of 12 world records were broken: 10 in the women's events and 2 in men's events, both in relays.

China won the most events, ten, all in women's events. Le Jingyi won two individual and three relay events to travel home with five golds; Dai Guohong went home with four golds and one silver. In the men's events, the USA and Australia won three events each. Tripp Schwenk of the USA garnered three golds, winning the two backstroke events and also swimming on the USA's winning medley relay team. Also winning 2 events each on the men's side were Fernando Scherer of Brazil (100m freestyle; 400m freestyle relay), Daniel Kowalski of Australia (400m and 1500m freestyles). Belgium and Moldova won their only medals at a Short Course Worlds (through 2006), while Franck Esposito won France's only gold to date when he won the 200 butterfly.

Participating nations
The 1993 SC Worlds featured 313 swimmers from 46 nations:

Results

Men's

Women's

Medal standings

References

 scmsom results
 HistoFINA Men
 HistoFINA Women
 (ed) Arvid Carlsen Sportsboken 94-95, pp. 299–300, Schibsted October 1994. .

FINA World Swimming Championships (25 m)
 
1993 in swimming
1993 in Spanish sport
International aquatics competitions hosted by Spain
Swimming competitions in Spain
December 1993 sports events in Europe
Sport in Palma de Mallorca